The 1990 NCAA Women's Golf Championships were contested at the ninth annual NCAA-sanctioned golf tournament to determine the individual and team national champions of women's collegiate golf in the United States. Until 1996, the NCAA would hold just one annual women's golf championship for all programs across Division I, Division II, and Division III.

The tournament was held at the Cobblestone Park Golf Course in Blythewood, South Carolina, a suburb of Columbia.

Arizona State won the team championship, the Sun Devils' first.

Susan Slaughter, from Arizona, won the individual title.

Individual results

Individual champion
 Susan Slaughter, Arizona (297, +9)

Team results

 DC = Defending champion
 Debut appearance

References

NCAA Women's Golf Championship
Golf in South Carolina
NCAA Women's Golf Championship
NCAA Women's Golf Championship
NCAA Women's Golf Championship
Women's sports in South Carolina